Nickola "Nick" Lalich (born 1945) is an Australian politician. He has been a Labor Party member of the New South Wales Legislative Assembly since October 2008, representing the electorate of Cabramatta. He also served as mayor of Fairfield from 2004 until March 2012.

Early life and career
Lalich was born in Egypt to refugee parents who had fled the war in Yugoslavia. His family migrated to Australia when he was three, and spent time in resettlement camps at Uranquinty and Bonegilla. They eventually settled in the Bonnyrigg area, where Lalich's father worked for the Department of the Postmaster-General and ran a farm.

Lalich remained in the Bonnyrigg area, where he worked as an electrician for Prospect Electricity before his election to the City of Fairfield council as a Labor candidate in 1987. He was elected by his colleagues as mayor in 1993–1994, and was a candidate for preselection for the seat of Cabramatta in 1994, losing to Reba Meagher. Lalich remained on council, was again elected mayor by his colleagues in 2002, and ran and won as the first popularly elected mayor of Fairfield in 2004. He was easily re-elected as mayor in late 2008, only weeks before his election to parliament in October 2008.

Election to parliament
In September 2008, Reba Meagher, the embattled state Health Minister, resigned from politics after it became clear that she would likely be dumped from Cabinet in a forthcoming ministerial reshuffle. This resulted in a by-election for her seat, and Lalich, who had lost a preselection vote to her in 1994, was immediately touted as her replacement, duly winning preselection. He faced a strong challenge in the usually safe seat due to an unpopular government and a strong Liberal candidate in Australian Broadcasting Corporation journalist Dai Le, but withstood a 20-point swing against Labor to hold the seat for the party. Lalich was sworn in as a member of the Legislative Assembly on 18 October, and appointed to the Public Bodies Review Committee on 30 October. He also vowed to continue as Fairfield mayor in addition to his parliamentary responsibilities.

March 2011 election 
Lalich was able to retain the seat of Cabramatta for the ALP at the March 2011 election against Dai Le, who failed previously at the 2008 by-election.  Controversy arose when leaflets were distributed during the campaign, stating Le supported her Liberal colleague Chris Spence, the Liberal candidate for The Entrance and former leader of Pauline Hanson One Nation. Both sides campaigned heavily in the local area, with the Liberal Party taking an unprecedented interest in Cabramatta.

In early 2012, Lalich announced his intention to step down as Mayor of the City of Fairfield to focus his efforts on being MP for Cabramatta this decision was made owing to changes in NSW Government legislation preventing state parliamentarians serving on local councils. This allowed for Frank Carbone to become mayor of Fairfield City on 21 March 2012.

On 24 December 2022, Lalich announced that he will be retiring at the 2023 state election.

References

 

1945 births
Living people
Members of the New South Wales Legislative Assembly
Yugoslav emigrants to Australia
Yugoslav refugees
Egyptian emigrants to Australia
Australian people of Serbian descent
Australian Labor Party members of the Parliament of New South Wales
Mayors of Fairfield, New South Wales
21st-century Australian politicians